Sparkle Moore (born Barbara Morgan on November 6, 1936 in Omaha, Nebraska, United States) is an American rockabilly singer who was influential as a pioneer of female rockabilly.  Her name arose because of her similarity to Sparkle Plenty, a supporting character in the Dick Tracy comic strip.  Sparkle dressed in men's clothing, often including leather, and sported an Elvis-influenced pompadour.

In 1956, she toured with Gene Vincent and was scheduled to perform on the Grand Ole Opry, which was subsequently cancelled due to illness.  In 1957, Sparkle retired from music to concentrate on raising a family.

In 2010, she released a 22 track CD of home recordings Spark-A-Billy.

Discography

Original releases
Fraternity F-751 - November 17, 1956 - "Rock-A-Bop" / "Skull And Cross Bones"
Fraternity F-766 - May 1957 - "Killer" / "Tiger"
Sparkle Moore - 2010 - Spark-A-Billy
Unissued tracks - "Flower Of My Heart", "Killer" [alt. vers.], "Tiger" [alt. vers.]

Compilation reissues
Ace CDCHD 1016 (CD) : Good Girls Gone Bad (Wild, Weird, And Wanted)Ace CDCHD 316 (CD) : All American Rock 'N' Roll From Fraternity RecordsAce CDCHD 815 (CD) : Them Rockabilly CatsAce CDCHD 822 (CD) : All American Rock 'N' Roll: The Fraternity Story, Vol. 2Crown 56- 200 (LP) : Rock, Rock, Rock, Vol. 2Eagle EA-R 90207 (CD) : Cool Off BabyFolkline 274- 162 (CD) : Rockabilly Kittens, Vol. 2Pompadour DA 002 (10-in. LP) : Man's Ruin: Skin-Tone Rock 'N' RollRounder 1031 (LP) : Wild, Wild Young WomenSupersonic LP-FV 1172 (LP) : Hot Boppin' Girls, Vol. 4Unlimited Prod. ULP 1006 (LP) :	Let's Have A Ball''

References

1936 births
Living people
American rockabilly musicians
Musicians from Omaha, Nebraska
Women rock singers
21st-century American women singers
21st-century American singers